The Ferrocarril de Sóller, acronym FS, is an interurban railway and the name for the company which operates the electrified  narrow gauge tracks running between the towns of Sóller and Palma on the Spanish island of Mallorca (stopping at various smaller towns such as Bunyola and Son Sardina).

The historic electric train takes a route north from the capital across the plains, winding through mountains and 13 tunnels of the Serra de Tramuntana, finally ending in the large railway station of the northern town of Sóller.

Work began on the railway in 1911 on the profits of the orange and lemon trade, which at the time was booming. For this reason, it is sometimes known as the Orange Express.

The train is now not only a mode of transport between these two key Mallorcan settlements, but also an attraction in itself, as of 2019 carrying over 1 million passengers a year. At the official prices charged at the station, single tickets from Palma to Sóller or vice versa cost €18 (2018), and returns are €25. The return ticket from Palma can be extended with a return ticket on the Sóller tram for an additional 7 Euros, which represents a 50% saving since the onboard tram fare is 7 Euros each way.

Palma railway station 

Palma Railway Station is a subtle, relatively small brown brick building with a large "Ferrocarril de Sóller" sign on its façade, partly given up to a museum, cleverly renovated so that the large glass windows reflect the railway tracks to make them look as if they go on into the rooms. The station is just off the Plaça de Espanya and borders a large and popular park which lies on top of the underground Estació Intermodal. Several old railway buildings (one with a large brick chimney) lie untouched in the park and there are several train-themed play structures, each one a carriage named after a settlement along the line.

Sóller railway station 
Sóller Railway Station on the other hand is much larger, developed from a fortified house dating from 1606, Ca'n Mayol. The station is also home to the tram which runs from Sóller to Port de Sóller and (inside the building) a museum dedicated to the works of Picasso and Joan Miró.

2019 anonymous takeover bid 

In 2019 an anonymous group of investors launched hostile €25m takeover bid for the railway, represented by Goros Investments. Most of the 172,000 shares in the private company are owned by about 800 local people.  a local tour operator and restaurateur and a company that runs boat trips around the north-east of the island are the two largest shareholders.

See also
Tranvía de Sóller

References

Notes

Bibliography

External links 

 Homepage of Ferrocarril de Sóller
 Timetable, Prices and History of Train to Sóller
 Video of Ferrocarril de Sóller on travelchannel.co.uk.
 El Tren De Soller: Mallorca's Vintage Electric Railway on 'Tim Traveller' (YouTube)

Railway lines in Spain
Rail transport in the Balearic Islands
Sóller
3 ft gauge railways in Spain